The Estadio Tigo La Huerta (formerly known as Estadio Dr. Nicolás Léoz) is a hybrid grass football stadium in Asunción, Paraguay. It is the home venue of Club Libertad. The arena seats 10,100 people.

References

External links
 Libertad Stadium Info
 Stadium pictures

Sports venues completed in 2005
Football venues in Asunción
Sports venues in Asunción
Estadio Dr. Nicolás Léoz